Tizi Ouasli is a town in Taza Province, Fès-Meknès, Morocco. According to the 2004 census it has a population of 1695.

References

 	

Populated places in Taza Province